Basketball at the 2012 Summer Olympics was the eighteenth appearance of the sport of basketball as an official Olympic medal event. It was held from 28 July to 12 August 2012. The preliminary matches and the women's quarterfinal matches were played in the new Basketball Arena in Olympic Park, which seated up to 12,000 spectators. The men's knockout games and the women's games, from semifinals onward were played in the North Greenwich Arena.

The US men's and US women's teams both successfully defended their Olympic basketball championships of 2008.

Settings
Two settings in London were used for the basketball tournaments: The O2 Arena (referred to as the "North Greenwich Arena" during the Olympics) and the Basketball Arena in Olympic Park at Stratford. The North Greenwich Arena was the setting for the knockout stages for the men, and also from the semifinal games onward for the women, whereas the Basketball Arena was the setting for the preliminary rounds and the women's quarterfinals.

Qualification

The National Olympic Committees may enter up to one 12-player men's team and up to one 12-player women's team.

Host
Initially, basketball was the only team sport in which the host country was not automatically awarded a team in the tournament. This was because the British basketball teams did not exist until 2006, and hence FIBA, the world's regulatory body of basketball, was concerned about the future of the British national basketball teams after 2012, as well as the probable lack of competitiveness of the British teams. However, in a meeting held in Lyon, France, on 13 March 2011, the FIBA's executive board agreed to allow the two British teams to enter automatically after all.

Men's qualification

Women's qualification

Competition format
Twelve qualified nations were drawn into two groups, each consisting of six teams. Each game result merits a corresponding point:
*The team has less than two players available to play on the court.**A team cannot present five players at the start of the game, or its actions prevent play from being resumed.
In case teams are tied on points, the tiebreaking criteria are, in order of first application:
Results of the games involving the tied teams (head-to-head records)
Goal average of the games involving the tied teams
Goal average of all of the games played
Points scored
Drawing of lots

The teams with the four best records qualified for the knockout stage, which was a single-elimination tournament. The semifinal winners contested for the gold medal, while the losers played for the bronze medal.

Calendar

Men's competition

The draw for the groups of the men's tournament was made on 30 April 2012. Included are the teams' FIBA World Rankings prior to the tournament.

Women's competition

The draw for the groups of the women's tournament was made on 30 April 2012. Included are the teams' FIBA World Rankings before the tournament.

Referees
The International Basketball Federation (FIBA) named the following 30 referees to officiate the basketball games at the 2012 Olympics.

  Samir Abaakil
  Recep Ankaralı
  Juan Carlos Arteaga
  Michael Aylen
  Ilija Belošević
  Snehal Bendke
  José Anibal Carrion
  Guerrino Cerebuch
  Elena Chernova
  Christos Christodoulou
  Carole Delauné
  Pablo Alberto Estévez
  Marcos Fornies Benito
  Vitalis Odhiambo Gode
  Felicia Andrea Grinter
  Carl Jungebrand
  William Gene Kennedy
  Luigi Lamonica
  Oļegs Latiševs
  Robert Lottermoser
  Cristiano Jesus Maranho
  Vaughan Charles Mayberry
  Rabah Noujaim
  Peng Ling
  Saša Pukl
  Borys Ryschyk
  Fernando Jorge Sampietro
  Stephen Seibel
  Shoko Sugruro
  Jorge Vázquez

Medal summary

Medal table

Events

Final standings

See also
 Wheelchair basketball at the 2012 Summer Paralympics

References

External links

 
 
 
 
 

 
2012
basketball
Basketball in London
2012 in basketball
International basketball competitions hosted by the United Kingdom
Olympics